Chronic mountain sickness (CMS) is a disease in which the proportion of blood volume that is occupied by red blood cells increases (polycythaemia) and there is an abnormally low level of oxygen in the blood (hypoxemia). CMS typically develops after extended time living at high altitude (over ). It is most common amongst native populations of high altitude nations. The most frequent symptoms of CMS are headache, dizziness, tinnitus, breathlessness, palpitations, sleep disturbance, fatigue, loss of appetite, confusion, cyanosis, and dilation of veins.

CMS was first described in 1925 by Carlos Monge Medrano, a Peruvian doctor who specialised in diseases of high altitude. While acute mountain sickness is experienced shortly after ascent to high altitude, chronic mountain sickness may develop only after many years of living at high altitude.

It has recently been correlated with increased expression of the genes ANP32D and SENP1.

Diagnosis 
CMS is characterised by polycythaemia (with subsequent increased haematocrit) and hypoxaemia; raised blood pressure in the lungs (pulmonary hypertension) can develop over time and in some cases progress to heart failure (cor pulmonale). CMS is believed to arise because of an excessive production of red blood cells (erythrocytes) due to the low oxygen levels at altitude, which increases the oxygen carrying capacity of the blood. The increased levels of erythrocytes causes increased blood viscosity and uneven blood flow through the lungs (V/Q mismatch). However, CMS is also considered an adaptation of pulmonary and heart disease to life under chronic hypoxia at altitude.

Consensus for clinical diagnosis of CMS use laboratory values: haemoglobin in Males ≥ 21 g/dL; Females ≥ 19 g/dL, haematocrit > 65%, and arterial oxygen saturation (SaO2) < 85% in both sexes.

Treatment 
Migration to low altitude is curative, though not immediate, as the body adapts to the normal oxygen level near sea-level and the haematocrit normalises. Alternatively, bloodletting (phlebotomy) can be performed to lower the haematocrit temporarily; when combined with volume replacement with fluids this can have a longer effect.

Medication with acetazolamide, a carbonic anhydrase inhibitor, has been shown to improve chronic mountain sickness by reducing erythropoietin and the resulting polycythaemia, which results in better arterial oxygenation and a lower heart rate.

Oxygen therapy and training in slow breathing techniques has been shown to reduce symptoms through increasing blood oxygenation.

Epidemiology
A 2013 study reviewed CMS prevalence rates around the world and found the highest rates were found in Andean countries of South America and the lowest rates in people native to the East African Mountains of Ethiopia. CMS prevalence rates reported from the study are summarised below:

 Ethiopia [3600–4100 m]: 0%
 Tibetan Plateau (Tibetans): 0.91–1.2%
 Indian Himalayas [3000–4200 m]: 4–7%
 Kyrgyzstan [3000–4200 m]: 4.6%
 Tibetan Plateau (Han Chinese): 5.6%
 La Paz, Bolivia [3600 m]: 6% to 8%
 Bolivia: 8–10%
 Cerro de Pasco, Peru [4300 m]: 14.8–18.2%

References

External links 

 Online calculator illustrating blood oxygen carrying capacity at altitude

Effects of external causes
Mountaineering and health